The 11 municipalities of the Tavastia Proper Region in Finland are divided on three sub-regions: 



Forssa sub-region 
Forssa
Humppila
Jokioinen (Jockis)
Tammela
Ypäjä

Hämeenlinna sub-region 
Hattula
Hämeenlinna (Tavastehus)
Janakkala

Riihimäki sub-region 
Hausjärvi
Loppi
Riihimäki

See also 
Southern Finland
Regions of Southern Finland

External links